The discography of Fionn Regan, an Irish folk musician and singer-songwriter, consists of five studio albums, five extended plays and seven singles.

Regan began his career in 2000 under the pseudonym "Bilbo" and released the three-song EP Slow Wall. Dropping his stage name in 2002, he released "Little Miss Drunk", a non-album single, and signed to Anvil Records, an independent label based in Brighton, United Kingdom. Regan followed up Slow Wall with the release of his second EP, Reservoir, in January 2003. Regan's final two EPs for Anvil, Hotel Room (2004) and Campaign Button (2005), led him to be signed to Bella Union, an independent label owned by former Cocteau Twins member Simon Raymonde. On Bella Union, Regan released his debut studio album, The End of History, in August 2006. A major critical success, the album was nominated for a number of awards in Ireland, the United Kingdom and the United States, including the Choice Music Prize, the Mercury Prize and the Shortlist Music Prize.

Following constant touring and promotion for The End of History, Regan signed to Lost Highway Records, a United States-based label, and recorded one unreleased album in 2008. Lost Highway refused to release the album, leading Regan to name it The Red Tapes. Relocating back to his native Wicklow, Regan recorded his second studio album, The Shadow of an Empire, and was signed to Heavenly Records. The album was well-received and resulted in two singles: "Protection Racket" and "Catacombs", both of which received extensive airplay. Regan's third studio album, 100 Acres of Sycamore, was released in August 2011 along with a further two singles, and his fourth studio album, The Bunkhouse Vol. 1: Anchor Black Tattoo, was released in September 2012.

Albums

Extended plays

Singles

Music videos

Other appearances

Notes
A  Slow Wall was released under the pseudonym "Bilbo."
B  Campaign Button was a tour-only EP released at Regan's 2005–2006 live performances.
C  Home Recording Sampler did not receive a retail release.
D  "Line Written in Winter" was a promotional release only.

References
General references

Specific references

External links
 at Heavenly Records

Regan, Fionn
Regan, Fionn